Precious Lara San Agustin Quigaman-Alcaraz  (born 3 January 1983) is a Filipino actress, multi-product endorser and beauty queen who won the Miss International 2005 beauty pageant held in Tokyo, Japan. She is the fourth Filipino to have won the crown, after Gemma Cruz in 1964, Aurora Pijuan in 1970, and Melanie Marquez in 1979. Prior to winning Miss International, Quigaman joined Binibining Pilipinas twice, first in 2001 and last in 2005. The latter ultimately earned her the title of Binibining Pilipinas International.

Biography
Based in Bristol, United Kingdom, Quigaman is the eldest of four children of Nelson Quigaman of Ligao City in the province of Albay and Princesita San Agustin, a registered nurse. She grew up in Biñan, Laguna, and eventually Bahrain, where her father worked. After five years, she returned to Biñan and finished high school at La Consolacion College. Before moving to Bahrain, she studied for a semester at the University of Santo Tomas in Manila. In England, she attended South Gloucestershire and Stroud College, originally called Filton College where she studied Media Production and Communication.

Quigaman got engaged to her longtime boyfriend, Marco Alcaraz in 2010 and got married in a civil ceremony on 1 January 2011 in Vancouver, Canada. Got married again on July 8, 2012 in a Christian wedding ceremony that was held at the Hacienda Isabela in Tagaytay City.

She gave birth to a seven-pound baby boy on 10 November, 12:52 a.m. via cesarean section at the Asian Hospital and Medical Center in Alabang, Muntinlupa.

Quigaman is a Born-again Christian and was criticized by netizens after several of her Instagram post were taken to oppose Pope Francis visiting the country.

Filmography

Television

Film

Awards and achievements
People Asia Magazine: People of the Year- 2005
Presidential Order of Lakandula: Champion for Life (Alongside Manny Pacquiao given by President Gloria Macapagal Arroyo).
Nominee for 23rd PMPC Star Awards for Movie. New Actress Award 2007

References

External links

1983 births
People from Albay
People from Taguig
Recipients of the Order of Lakandula
Bicolano actors
Filipino expatriates in the United Kingdom
Living people
Bicolano people
Miss International winners
Miss International 2005 delegates
Binibining Pilipinas winners
GMA Network personalities
ABS-CBN personalities
Star Magic
Filipino female models
Filipino film actresses
Filipino television personalities
Actresses from Metro Manila
Actresses from Laguna (province)
People from Biñan
Filipino Christians
Filipino evangelicals